Pohale Caves, also Pohala Caves or Pawala Caves, are a group of Buddhist caves located in Kolhapur District, Maharashtra, India, about 15 km northeast of Kolhapur.

The caves are rather plain and were excavated in a rocky area near Jyotiba's hill.

There is one large vihara, about square of about 34', with 14 columns on three sides and 22 cells around the central hall (7’ long, 5’ broad and 7’ high). There is also a Chaitya, and one more cave with a raised rock-cut seat for a teacher, with a watern cistern.

References

Buddhist caves in India
Caves of Maharashtra
Indian rock-cut architecture
Former populated places in India
Buddhist pilgrimage sites in India
Buddhist monasteries in India
Buddhist temples in India
Caves containing pictograms in India
Tourist attractions in Ratnagiri district